Ryan J. Condal (born ) is an American screenwriter and an executive producer who is a creator and a showrunner for the 2022 TV series House of the Dragon, a prequel to the TV series Game of Thrones (2011–2019). Condal and Carlton Cuse were creators and showrunners for the TV series Colony (2016–2018). He was also a screenwriter for the films Hercules (2014) and Rampage (2018).

Background

Upbringing and early career efforts
He graduated from Villanova University in 2001 with a Bachelor of Accountancy degree. After college, he lived on the East Side in Manhattan and worked in the pharmaceutical industry for eight years, first working in marketing then shifting to advertising. While working, he submitted stories to competitions to win fellowships and grants and started placing in competitions. He was able to transfer his job to Los Angeles, where he continued writing. He eventually sold a script titled Galahad to The Film Company in early 2008. The film stalled in development hell, and the script ranked in the Top 15 of The Black List for 2008. He was subsequently hired by Universal Pictures to write an adaptation of the Radical Comics 2008 comic book series Hercules: The Thracian Wars. The studio 20th Century Fox also hired Condal to write a new draft of a screenplay adapting the Oni Press comic book series Queen & Country. By 2010, Condal helped rewrite a screenplay adapting the epic 17th-century English poem Paradise Lost for Legendary Pictures.

By 2012, he was working on a film adaptation of The Art of War by Sun Tzu, also for Legendary, though by late 2013, screenwriter Alex Litvak was hired to write a new approach. Also in 2012, Condal was hired by CBS Films to write an English-language remake of the 2009 Spanish-language film Celda 211. He was also hired to write a film titled Boy Nobody for Sony Pictures. Condal began collaboration with Carlton Cuse to produce for NBC a television pilot of the comic book series The Sixth Gun. Condal wrote the pilot, and he and Cuse were executive producers of the pilot. The pilot was green-lighted in 2013, and it was filmed in the US state of New Mexico, but NBC did not pick up the series.

First credits: Hercules, Colony, and Rampage
Condal's first official screenwriting credit, shared with Evan Spiliotopoulos, was for the 2014 film Hercules. Condal had written an initial script for Paramount Pictures, and Spiliotopoulos revised the script. Meanwhile, despite the pilot for The Sixth Gun not becoming a TV series, Condal and Carlton Cuse sought to work together again and co-created the project that would become the TV series Colony (2016–2018). In 2014, USA Network green-lighted a television pilot. The pilot for Colony was picked up and ultimately became a TV series co-produced by Legendary Television and Universal Cable Productions. It premiered on USA Network in January 2016. Colony lasted for three seasons, from 2016 to 2018, and was canceled in July 2018 before the third season's finale.

In 2016 before Colony premiered, Condal and Cuse were hired to rewrite the script for the film Rampage produced under New Line Cinema. They rewrote a draft written by Ryan Engle, and Adam Sztykiel wrote the final revisions. Later in 2016, Condal began writing a screenplay for Warner Bros.'s perpetually-in-development remake of the 1976 science fiction film Logan's Run, itself based on a book published in 1967. By early 2018, Condal created and wrote Conan, a potential TV series adapting the character Conan the Barbarian as written by Robert E. Howard, and the series was acquired by Amazon Studios. Condal also submitted a script to Lionsgate that would reboot the Highlander film series, a studio effort that was a decade old. Shortly after Rampages release in the second quarter of 2018, Lionsgate hired Condal to write a screenplay adapting the Image Comics series Analog.

Creating House of the Dragon
With A Song of Ice and Fire author George R. R. Martin, Condal created the HBO TV series House of the Dragon that is a prequel to the TV series Game of Thrones (2011–2019). Condal, who was familiar with A Song of Ice and Fire, first met Martin at a book convention in 2005. By 2013, when Condal was working on The Sixth Gun, he successfully sought a meeting with Martin, and the two developed a friendship. In late 2019, HBO ordered the prequel series to be produced. Condal served as a showrunner with Miguel Sapochnik and also served as an executive producer with Sapochnik, Martin, and Vince Gerardis. House of the Dragon premiered in August 2022, and by the end of the month, Sapochnik stepped down as showrunner, leaving Condal as the remaining showrunner for House of the Dragon. The TV series was renewed for a second season with Condal as the sole showrunner.

Credits

References

External links

American screenwriters
People from Hasbrouck Heights, New Jersey
Showrunners
Villanova University alumni
Living people
Year of birth missing (living people)